L. Ron is the third and final studio album by the American noise rock band Barkmarket, released on June 11, 1996 by American Recordings.

Track listing

Personnel 
Adapted from the L. Ron liner notes.

Barkmarket
 John Nowlin – bass guitar, strings, percussion
 Dave Sardy – lead vocals, guitar, production, recording, mixing
 Rock Savage – drums

Production and additional personnel
 Edward Douglas – engineering
 Suzie Dyer – engineering
 Kevin Gray – mastering

Release history

References

External links 
 

1996 albums
American Recordings (record label) albums
Barkmarket albums
Albums produced by Dave Sardy